Aspray Chester Deeside Dragons  are a Welsh ice hockey team that play in the National Ice Hockey League, north division.
They play their games at Deeside Leisure Centre, Flintshire, and replaced the previous team Flintshire Freeze. They won the North League championship in the 2015/16 season, with a record of 24-3-1 as well as the 2015/16 Laidler Playoffs. For the 2022/23 season the club has Aspray Chester  as the clubs title sponsor.

The 2022/23 season sees the return of ice hockey to North Wales for the first time in over 2 years, due to the ice rink being used as a field hospital and later a vaccination centre for North East Wales. 

In July 2015 it was reported that the Dragons had been bought by Red Hockey Limited, a British Company who own the Telford Tigers English Premier League Ice Hockey team as well as having stakes in Manchester Phoenix and Bracknell Bees.

In 2015/16, the team won the league, gaining promotion to NIHL North 1 (Moralee). During the season there were issues between the owners of the Deeside Dragons and Flintshire County Council which resulted in the ownership of the Dragons being removed from Red Hockey. Despite prior fears with the ownership of the Deeside Dragons logo these have been quelled with a rebranded logo.
On the final home game of the 2015/16 season the Dragons were involved in an incident which saw their opponents Widnes Wild walk off the ice in the second period and refuse to continue the game.  Dragons player Alex Roberts received a three-game ban as a result of this incident.

In July 2016 it was announced that Scott McKenzie had left the Widnes Wild to join the Dragons as player-coach. He left the following year.

At the end of the 2017/18 season the Dragons were relegated to the North Division 2 league.

Season-by-season record

Club roster 2022-23
(*) Denotes a Non-British Trained player (Import)

2021/22 Outgoing

References 

Sport in Flintshire
Ice hockey teams in Wales